Dear Phoebe is an American situation comedy about a male former college professor who poses as an elderly woman to write a newspaper advice column. It aired on NBC from September 1954 to April 1955. The series stars Peter Lawford and Marcia Henderson.

Synopsis
Bill Hastings, a college professor in Los Angeles, California, leaves his job at UCLA to pursue a career as a journalist. He lands a job with the Los Angeles Daily Star, where his duties include writing the newspaper's advice column "Dear Phoebe," supposedly written by a fictitious elderly woman named Phoebe Goodheart.

At the newspaper, Bill meets sportswriter Michelle "Mickey" Riley. They both reside in Los Angeles, Bill at 165 La Paloma Drive and Mickey at 34 West Sunset Boulevard. They share a mutual attraction which Bill is open about, but their romance is a rocky one because Mickey prefers to hide her feelings for Bill by competing strongly with him for plum writing assignments from the newspaper's stingy and crusty old managing editor, Clyde Fosdick. Bill thus finds himself advising the readers of "Dear Phoebe" about their problems while having to deal with romantic ones of his own.

Also at the paper is Humphrey Winston Humpsteader, a stereotypical young copy writer trying to make it big in the newspaper business who likes to spend time at Ye Olde Malt Shoppe, where the slogan is "Teenage Spoken Here." Humphrey is a strong young man able to rip telephone books in half and often gets into fights, although even a slight slap across his face is enough to put him out of action.

Cast

Bill Hastings...Peter Lawford
Michelle "Mickey" Riley...Marcia Henderson
Clyde Fosdick...Charles Lane
Humphrey Winston Humpsteader...Joe Corey

Production

Alex Gottlieb created and produced Dear Phoebe, which was a Chrislaw Production. The show was produced without a laugh track.

Peter Lawford's wife Patricia Kennedy Lawford, sister of future U.S. president John F. Kennedy, makes a cameo appearance in an episode of Dear Phoebe.

Broadcast history
Dear Phoebe premiered on September 10, 1954, and ran for 31 episodes, airing on NBC at 9:30 p.m. Eastern Time on Fridays throughout its run. It was cancelled after a single season, and its last original episode aired on April 8, 1955. Reruns of the show then continued in its regular time slot until September 2, 1955.

During the summer of 1956, NBC broadcast reruns of Dear Phoebe in prime time from June to September. The 1956 reruns aired at 8:00 p.m. Eastern Time on Tuesdays, the last of them on September 11. NBC also aired reruns of Dear Phoebe in the afternoon during the summer of 1957 and again during the winter of 1958.

Episodes

Original episodes

Other episodes

Although sources agree on Dear Phoebe′s 31-episode original run, they also list two additional episodes aired as reruns during 1955 after the broadcast of the show's last original episode, neither of which have titles or plot descriptions easily attributable to any of the 31 original episodes.

References

External links
 
 Dear Phoebe opening credits on YouTube
 Dear Phoebe alternative opening credits on YouTube
 Dear Phoebe episode "The Christmas Show" on YouTube

1954 American television series debuts
1955 American television series endings
1950s American sitcoms
Black-and-white American television shows
English-language television shows
NBC original programming
Television shows set in Los Angeles